St. Thomas College of Teacher Education, Pala is a teacher education institution in Kerala, India and is accredited by the National Assessment and Accreditation Council (NAAC).  The institution was founded by the Syro-Malabar Catholic Diocese of Palai in 1957 and trains teachers for secondary education in India.

See also
 List of teacher education schools in India

References

External links
 Official web site

Colleges of education in India
Christian universities and colleges in India
Colleges in Kerala
Syro-Malabar Catholic Church
Universities and colleges in Kottayam district
Educational institutions established in 1957
1957 establishments in Kerala
Education in Pala, Kerala